James Wheeler Pearcy (July 26, 1918 – March 15, 2005) was an American football guard.

Pearcy was born in Harrisville, West Virginia, and attended Victory High School in Clarksburg, West Virginia. He played college football for Marshall from 1939 to 1941. 

Pearcy served in the Marine Corps during World War II, served in the Pacific Theater, and received a Purple Heart, Bronze, and Silver Star. He was one of three Marines in his platoon to survive the Battle of Iwo Jima.

He played professional football in the All-America Football Conference for the Chicago Rockets from 1946 to 1948 and for the Chicago Hornets in 1949. He appeared in 49 games, 30 as a starter.

Pearcy was inducted into the Marshall Athletics Hall of Fame in 1984. He died in Hendersonville, North Carolina, in 2005.

References

1918 births
2005 deaths
American football guards
Chicago Rockets players
Chicago Hornets players
Marshall Thundering Herd football players
Players of American football from West Virginia
United States Marine Corps personnel of World War II
Recipients of the Silver Star
People from Harrisville, West Virginia
Sportspeople from Clarksburg, West Virginia
Military personnel from Clarksburg, West Virginia